Sogerail (later Corus France SA, 1999; Tata Steel France Rail, 2006) is a railway rail manufacturer near Hayange, in the Lorraine region of France. The company was formed 1994 as a subsidiary of Usinor-Sacilor.

The business was acquired by Corus Group plc in 1999, becoming part of Tata Steel Europe in 2006 through merger of the parent company. In 2016 the company and other long products businesses in the Tata Steel Europe were divested, being acquired by Greybull Capital.

Iron production at Hayange was established by the De Wendel family in 1892 as the Usine Saint Jacques.

History
The iron industry at the Sogerail site in Nilvange/Knutange near Hayange (Moselle department, Lorraine, France) dates to c. 1892 with the establishment of the Usine Saint Jacques by the de Wendels.

By the late 20th century the works had become part of Usinor-Sacilor it its long products division in the Sollac subsidiary. Under Usinor-Sacilor steel was supplied to the plant from the nearby Florange steelworks, and earlier from the Unimétal plant in Gandrange (sold to Ispat). In the 1990s Usinor-Sacilor sought to divest its long products division.

In 1999 Sogerail, then employing c. 500 persons was acquired from Usinor by British Steel Corporation (BSC) for £83 million, adding to its pre-exisintg rail manufacturing site in Workington, Cumbria, UK. Steel supply from Sollac continued until BSC began to supply Sogerail with unfinished steel from its Scunthorpe plant.

In 2005 BSC's successor Corus Group plc restructured its railway rail manufacturing, closing its Workington site, and establishing rail manufacturing at the Scunthorpe steelworks, UK.

In 2006 Tata Steel acquired Corus forming Tata Steel Europe - the Hayange plant became Tata Steel France Rail SA. (France Reg. No. B 391 575 354); in 2016 the long products division of Tata Steel Europe including the Hayange plant was sold to Greybull Capital for a nominal sum. In August 2020, UK-based Liberty Steel acquired the Havange plant.

References

Steel companies of France
Tata Steel Europe
Moselle (department)
Rail infrastructure manufacturers